Carlette is a given name that is a variant of Carla. Notable people with the name include:

Carlette Ewell (born 1971), American boxer
Carlette Guidry-White (born 1968), American sprinter

See also

Pamela Charlette
Carletto

Feminine given names